Abbà Pater is a devotional album from Pope John Paul II released in 1999 in anticipation of the Great Jubilee for Radio Vaticana. The album reached #175 on the Billboard album chart. The pontiff had reached #126 in 1979 with another album, "Pope John Paul II Sings At The Festival Of Sacrosong." Abbà Pater is made up entirely of original compositions. Many of the lyrics are derived from the Bible and Roman Catholic liturgy. The liner notes are composed in English, Italian, French, Spanish and Portuguese.

Track listing
All songs written by Leonardo De Amicis, except where noted:
"Cercate il Suo Volto" ("") – 3:03
"Cristo È Liberazione" ("") – 3:25
"Verbum Caro Factum Est" ("") – 1:07
"Abbà Pater" – 5:46
"Vieni, Santo Spirito" ("") – 9:24
"Padre, Ti Chiediamo Perdono" ("") – 3:12
"Dove C'è Amore C'è Dio" ("") (Stefano Mainetti) – 4:06
"Padre Della Luce" ("") – 4:26
"Un Comandamento Nuovo" ("") (Stefano Mainetti) – 3:00
"Madre di Tutte le Genti" ("") – 5:37
"La Legge Delle Beatitudini" ("") – 6:08

Personnel
Pope John Paul II – vocals
Orchestra Nuova Sinfonietta Roma, conducted by Riccardo Biseo – Tracks 2–5, 8, 9–11
Orchestra St. Caterina d'Allesandria, conducted by Leonardo De Amicis – Tracks 1 and 6
Roman Academy Choir – Tracks 3, 4, 7, and 9
Pablo Colino's Choir – Track 4
Echo – Track 8
Catharina Scharp – Vocals on tracks 3, 5, and 9

Release history

Chart performance

Certifications and sales

References

External links

1999 albums
Pope John Paul II albums
Sony Classical Records albums
1999 in Christianity
Italian-language albums
Latin-language albums